Naushad Alam is an Indian politician belonging to Janata Dal (United). He was elected as a member of Bihar Legislative Assembly from Thakurganj in 2010 and 2015. He has served as a Zila Prishad member from 2000 to 2005 of Kishanganj.

He served as the Ministry of Minority Welfare Department in Bihar and also served as JDU WHIP in Bihar Vidhan sabha.

References

Living people
Janata Dal (United) politicians
Year of birth missing (living people)
Bihar MLAs 2010–2015
Bihar MLAs 2015–2020
Lok Janshakti Party politicians
Bihar MLAs 2020–2025